Browns Point is a census-designated place (CDP) in Pierce County, Washington, United States, bordered by Tacoma on the east and Puget Sound on all other sides. The population was 1,198 at the 2010 census. The Tacoma neighborhood immediately adjacent to Browns Point is also referred to locally as "Browns Point" (although it is also often referred to as Northeast Tacoma).

Geography
Browns Point is located at  (47.305833, -122.443889).

According to the United States Census Bureau, the CDP has a total area of 0.403 square miles (1.04 km), all land.

History
Originally named Point Harris, after Alvin Harris, a sailmaker on the Wilkes Expedition, Browns Point was later renamed by residents for an early landowner.

Culture
Browns Point is home to the Browns Point Lighthouse, which, although now fully automated, was once fully staffed and was first lit on December 12, 1887.

The community is supported by the local Browns Point Improvement Club, which owns much of the land adjacent to the lighthouse. The club is best known in the Pacific Northwest for its fundraiser, the Browns Point Salmon Bake. Started in the 1940s by Browns Point pioneer and Puyallup tribal member Jerry Meeker, the festival is held in the first weekend of August in even-numbered years.

Education
The area is served by Tacoma Public Schools, a public school district. It is zoned to Browns Point Elementary School, Meeker Middle School, and Stadium High School.

References

External links
Points Northeast Historical Society
Lighthouse Friends entry about Browns Point
Browns Point Lighthouse Park
History Link article about the lighthouse station

Unincorporated communities in Pierce County, Washington
Unincorporated communities in Washington (state)